This list of birds of Idaho includes species documented in the U.S. state of Idaho and accepted by the Idaho Bird Records Committee (IBRC). As of January 2022, there were 433 species on the official list. One additional species is considered hypothetical. Of the 433, 180 are review species in part or all of the state.(see note) Eight species found in Idaho have been introduced to North America. One species on the list is extinct.

Only birds that are considered to have established, self-sustaining, wild populations in Idaho are included on this list. This means that birds that are considered probable escapees, although they may have been sighted flying free in Idaho, are not included.

This list is presented in the taxonomic sequence of the Check-list of North and Middle American Birds, 7th edition through the 62nd Supplement, published by the American Ornithological Society (AOS). Common and scientific names are also those of the Check-list, except that the common names of families are from the Clements taxonomy because the AOS list does not include them.

The following tags have been used to annotate some species:

(R) Review species - Species which are rare enough in some part of Idaho that the IBRC requests detailed reports of sightings
(I) Introduced - a species introduced to North America by the actions of humans, either directly or indirectly

Ducks, geese, and waterfowl

Order: AnseriformesFamily: Anatidae

The family Anatidae includes the ducks and most duck-like waterfowl, such as geese and swans. These birds are adapted to an aquatic existence with webbed feet, bills which are flattened to a greater or lesser extent, and feathers that are excellent at shedding water due to special oils. Forty species have been recorded in Idaho.

Emperor goose, Anser canagica (R)
Snow goose, Anser caerulescens
Ross's goose, Anser rossii
Greater white-fronted goose, Anser albifrons
Brant, Branta bernicla (R)
Cackling goose, Branta hutchinsonii (R)
Canada goose, Branta canadensis
Trumpeter swan, Cygnus buccinator
Tundra swan, Cygnus columbianus
"Bewick's" tundra swan, Cygnus columbianus bewickii (R)
Whooper swan, Cygnus cygnus (R)
Wood duck, Aix sponsa
Garganey, Spatula querquedula (R)
Blue-winged teal, Spatula discors
Cinnamon teal, Spatula cyanoptera
Northern shoveler, Spatula clypeata
Gadwall, Mareca strepera
Eurasian wigeon, Mareca penelope
American wigeon, Mareca americana
American black duck, Anas rubripes (R)
Mallard, Anas platyrhynchos
Northern pintail, Anas acuta
Green-winged teal, Anas crecca
"Eurasian" green-winged teal, Anas crecca crecca (R)
Canvasback, Aythya valisineria
Redhead, Aythya americana
Ring-necked duck, Aythya collaris
Tufted duck, Aythya fuligula (R)
Greater scaup, Aythya marila
Lesser scaup, Aythya affinis
Harlequin duck, Histrionicus histrionicus (R)
Surf scoter, Melanitta perspicillata
White-winged scoter, Melanitta deglandi
Black scoter, Melanitta americana (R)
Long-tailed duck, Clangula hyemalis
Bufflehead, Bucephala albeola
Common goldeneye, Bucephala clangula
Barrow's goldeneye, Bucephala islandica
Hooded merganser, Lophodytes cucullatus
Common merganser, Mergus merganser
Red-breasted merganser, Mergus serrator
Ruddy duck, Oxyura jamaicensis

New World quail
Order: GalliformesFamily: Odontophoridae

The New World quails are small, plump terrestrial birds only distantly related to the quails of the Old World, but named for their similar appearance and habits. Three species have been recorded in Idaho.

Mountain quail, Callipepla pictus (R)
California quail, Callipepla californica
Gambel's quail, Callipepla gambelii (R)

Pheasants, grouse, and allies
Order: GalliformesFamily: Phasianidae

Phasianidae consists of the pheasants and their allies. These are terrestrial species, variable in size but generally plump with broad relatively short wings. Many species are gamebirds or have been domesticated as a food source for humans. Ten species have been recorded in Idaho.

Wild turkey, Meleagris gallopavo
Ruffed grouse, Bonasa umbellus
Spruce grouse, Canachites canadensis (R)
White-tailed ptarmigan, Lagopus leucurus (R)
Greater sage-grouse, Centrocercus urophasianus (R)
Dusky grouse, Dendragapus obscurus
Sharp-tailed grouse, Tympanuchus phasianellus (R)
Gray partridge, Perdix perdix (I)
Ring-necked pheasant, Phasianus colchicus (I)
Chukar, Alectoris chukar (I)

Grebes

Order: PodicipediformesFamily: Podicipedidae

Grebes are small to medium-large freshwater diving birds. They have lobed toes and are excellent swimmers and divers. However, they have their feet placed far back on the body, making them quite ungainly on land. Six species have been recorded in Idaho.

Pied-billed grebe, Podilymbus podiceps
Horned grebe, Podiceps auritus
Red-necked grebe, Podiceps grisegena
Eared grebe, Podiceps nigricollis
Western grebe, Aechmorphorus occidentalis
Clark's grebe, Aechmorphorus clarkii

Pigeons and doves
Order: ColumbiformesFamily: Columbidae

Pigeons and doves are stout-bodied birds with short necks and short slender bills with a fleshy cere. Six species have been recorded in Idaho.

Rock pigeon, Columba livia (I)
Band-tailed pigeon, Patagioenas fasciata (R)
Eurasian collared-dove, Streptopelia decaocto (I)
Passenger pigeon, Ectopistes migratorius (Extinct)
White-winged dove, Zenaida asiatica (R)
Mourning dove, Zenaida macroura

Cuckoos
Order: CuculiformesFamily: Cuculidae

The family Cuculidae includes cuckoos, roadrunners, and anis. These birds are of variable size with slender bodies, long tails, and strong legs. Two species have been recorded in Idaho.

Yellow-billed cuckoo, Coccyzus americanus (R)
Black-billed cuckoo, Coccyzus erythropthalmus (R)

Nightjars and allies
Order: CaprimulgiformesFamily: Caprimulgidae

Nightjars are medium-sized nocturnal birds that usually nest on the ground. They have long wings, short legs, and very short bills. Most have small feet, of little use for walking, and long pointed wings. Their soft plumage is cryptically colored to resemble bark or leaves. Two species have been recorded in Idaho.

Common nighthawk,  Chordeiles minor
Common poorwill,  Phalaenoptilus nuttallii

Swifts
Order: ApodiformesFamily: Apodidae

The swifts are small birds which spend the majority of their lives flying. These birds have very short legs and never settle voluntarily on the ground, perching instead only on vertical surfaces. Many swifts have very long, swept-back wings which resemble a crescent or boomerang. Four species have been recorded in Idaho.

Black swift, Cypseloides niger (R)
Chimney swift, Chaetura pelagica (R)
Vaux's swift, Chaetura vauxi
White-throated swift, Aeronautes saxatalis

Hummingbirds
Order: ApodiformesFamily: Trochilidae

Hummingbirds are small birds capable of hovering in mid-air due to the rapid flapping of their wings. They are the only birds that can fly backwards. Eight species have been recorded in Idaho.

Ruby-throated hummingbird, Archilochus colubris (R)
Black-chinned hummingbird, Archilochus alexandri
Anna's hummingbird, Calypte anna (R)
Costa's hummingbird, Calypte costae (R)
Calliope hummingbird, Selasphorus calliope
Rufous hummingbird, Selasphorus rufus
Broad-tailed hummingbird, Selasphorus platycercus (R)
Broad-billed hummingbird, Cynanthus latirostris (R)

Rails, gallinules, and coots

Order: GruiformesFamily: Rallidae

Rallidae is a large family of small to medium-sized birds which includes the rails, crakes, coots, and gallinules. The most typical family members occupy dense vegetation in damp environments near lakes, swamps, or rivers. In general they are shy and secretive birds, making them difficult to observe. Most species have strong legs and long toes which are well adapted to soft uneven surfaces. They tend to have short, rounded wings and tend to be weak fliers. Five species have been recorded in Idaho.

Virginia rail, Rallus limicola
Sora, Porzana carolina
Common gallinule, Gallinula galeata (R)
American coot, Fulica americana
Yellow rail, Coturnicops noveboracensis (R)

Cranes
Order: GruiformesFamily: Gruidae

Cranes are large, long-legged, and long-necked birds. Unlike the similar-looking but unrelated herons, cranes fly with necks outstretched, not pulled back. Most have elaborate and noisy courting displays or "dances". Two species have been recorded in Idaho.

Sandhill crane, Aantigone canadensis
Whooping crane, Grus americana (R)

Stilts and avocets
Order: CharadriiformesFamily: Recurvirostridae

Recurvirostridae is a family of large wading birds which includes the avocets and stilts. The avocets have long legs and long up-curved bills. The stilts have extremely long legs and long, thin, straight bills. Two species have been recorded in Idaho.

Black-necked stilt, Himantopus mexicanus
American avocet, Recurvirostra americana

Oystercatchers
Order: CharadriiformesFamily: Haematopodidae

The oystercatchers are large, obvious and noisy plover-like birds, with strong bills used for smashing or prising open molluscs. One species has been recorded in Idaho.

American oystercatcher, Haematopus palliatus (R)

Lapwings and plovers

Order: CharadriiformesFamily: Charadriidae

The family Charadriidae includes the plovers, dotterels, and lapwings. They are small to medium-sized birds with compact bodies, short thick necks, and long, usually pointed, wings. They are found in open country worldwide, mostly in habitats near water. Seven species have been recorded in Idaho.

Black-bellied plover, Pluvialis squatarola
American golden-plover, Pluvialis dominica
Pacific golden-plover, Pluvialis fulva (R)
Killdeer, Charadrius vociferus
Semipalmated plover, Charadrius semipalmatus
Snowy plover, Charadrius nivosus (R)
Mountain plover, Charadrius montanus (R)

Sandpipers and allies

Order: CharadriiformesFamily: Scolopacidae

Scolopacidae is a large diverse family of small to medium-sized shorebirds including the sandpipers, curlews, godwits, shanks, tattlers, woodcocks, snipes, dowitchers, and phalaropes. The majority of these species eat small invertebrates picked out of the mud or soil. Different lengths of legs and bills enable multiple species to feed in the same habitat, particularly on the coast, without direct competition for food. Thirty species have been recorded in Idaho.

Upland sandpiper, Bartramia longicauda (R)
Whimbrel, Numenius phaeopus (R)
Long-billed curlew, Numenius americanus
Hudsonian godwit, Limosa haemastica (R)
Marbled godwit, Limosa fedoa
Ruddy turnstone, Arenaria interpres (R)
Red knot, Calidris canutus (R)
Ruff, Calidris pugnax (R)
Sharp-tailed sandpiper, Calidris acuminata (R)
Stilt sandpiper, Calidris himantopus
Sanderling, Calidris alba
Dunlin, Calidris alpina
Baird's sandpiper, Calidris bairdii
Least sandpiper, Calidris minutilla
White-rumped sandpiper, Calidris fuscicollis (R)
Buff-breasted sandpiper, Calidris subruficollis (R)
Pectoral sandpiper, Calidris melanotos
Semipalmated sandpiper, Calidris pusilla
Western sandpiper, Calidris mauri
Short-billed dowitcher, Limnodromus griseus (R)
Long-billed dowitcher, Limnodromus scolopaceus
Wilson's snipe, Gallinago delicata
Spotted sandpiper, Actitis macularius
Solitary sandpiper, Tringa solitaria
Lesser yellowlegs, Tringa flavipes
Willet, Tringa semipalmata
Greater yellowlegs, Tringa melanoleuca
Wilson's phalarope, Phalaropus tricolor
Red-necked phalarope, Phalaropus lobatus
Red phalarope, Phalaropus fulicarius (R)

Skuas and jaegers
Order: CharadriiformesFamily: Stercorariidae

Skuas and jaegers are in general medium to large birds, typically with gray or brown plumage, often with white markings on the wings. They have longish bills with hooked tips and webbed feet with sharp claws. They look like large dark gulls, but have a fleshy cere above the upper mandible. They are strong, acrobatic fliers. Three species have been recorded in Idaho.

Pomarine jaeger, Stercorarius pomarinus (R)
Parasitic jaeger, Stercorarius parasiticus (R)
Long-tailed jaeger, Stercorarius longicaudus (R)

Auks, murres, and puffins
Order: CharadriiformesFamily: Alcidae

The family Alcidae includes auks, murres, and puffins. These are short-winged birds that live on the open sea and normally only come ashore for breeding. One species has been recorded in Idaho.

Ancient murrelet, Synthliboarmphus antiquus (R)

Gulls, terns, and skimmers

Order: CharadriiformesFamily: Laridae

Laridae is a family of medium to large seabirds and includes gulls, terns, kittiwakes, and skimmers. They are typically gray or white, often with black markings on the head or wings. They have stout, longish bills and webbed feet. Twenty-five species have been recorded in Idaho.

Black-legged kittiwake, Rissa tridactyla (R)
Sabine's gull, Xema sabini
Bonaparte's gull, Chroicocephalus philadelphia
Little gull, Hydrocoloeus minutus (R)
Ross's gull, Rhodostethia rosea (R)
Laughing gull, Leucophaeus atricilla (R)
Franklin's gull, Leucophaeus pipixcan
Heermann's gull, Larus heermanni (R)
Short-billed gull, Larus brachyrhynchus 
Ring-billed gull, Larus delawarensis
Western gull, Larus occidentalis (R)
California gull, Larus californicus
Herring gull, Larus argentatus
"Vega" herring gull, Larus argentatus vegae (R)
Iceland gull, Larus glaucoides (R)
Lesser black-backed gull, Larus fuscus (R)
Slaty-backed gull, Larus schistisagus (R)
Glaucous-winged gull, Larus glaucescens (R)
Glaucous gull, Larus hyperboreus (R)
Great black-backed gull, Larus marinus (R)
Least tern, Sternula antillarum (R)
Caspian tern, Hydroprogne caspia
Black tern, Chlidonias niger
Common tern, Sterna hirundo
Arctic tern, Sterna paradisaea (R)
Forster's tern, Sterna forsteri

Loons
Order: GaviiformesFamily: Gaviidae

Loons are aquatic birds the size of a large duck, to which they are unrelated. Their plumage is largely gray or black, and they have spear-shaped bills. Loons swim well and fly adequately, but are almost hopeless on land, because their legs are placed towards the rear of the body. Four species have been recorded in Idaho.

Red-throated loon, Gavia stellata (R)
Pacific loon, Gavia pacifica
Common loon, Gavia immer
Yellow-billed loon, Gavia adamsii (R)

Storks
Order: CiconiiformesFamily: Ciconiidae

Storks are large, heavy, long-legged, long-necked wading birds with long stout bills and wide wingspans. They lack the powder down that other wading birds such as herons, spoonbills, and ibises use to clean off fish slime. Storks lack a pharynx and are mute. One species has been recorded in Idaho.

Wood stork, Mycteria americana (R)

Cormorants and shags
Order: SuliformesFamily: Phalacrocoracidae

Cormorants are medium-to-large aquatic birds, usually with mainly dark plumage and areas of colored skin on the face. The bill is long, thin and sharply hooked. Their feet are four-toed and webbed. Two species have been recorded in Idaho.

Double-crested cormorant, Nannopterum auritum
Neotropic cormorant, Nannopterum brasilianum (R)

Pelicans
Order: PelecaniformesFamily: Pelecanidae

Pelicans are very large water birds with a distinctive pouch under their beak. Like other birds in the order Pelecaniformes, they have four webbed toes. Two species have been recorded in Idaho.

American white pelican, Pelecanus erythrorhynchos
Brown pelican, Pelecanus occidentalis (R)

Herons, egrets, and bitterns

Order: PelecaniformesFamily: Ardeidae

The family Ardeidae contains the herons, egrets, and bitterns. Herons and egrets are medium to large wading birds with long necks and legs. Bitterns tend to be shorter necked and more secretive. Members of Ardeidae fly with their necks retracted, unlike other long-necked birds such as storks, ibises, and spoonbills. Eleven species have been recorded in Idaho.

American bittern, Botaurus lentiginosus
Least bittern, Ixobrychus exilis (R)
Great blue heron, Ardea herodias
Great egret, Ardea alba
Snowy egret, Egretta thula
Little blue heron, Egretta caerulea (R)
Tricolored heron, Egretta tricolor (R)
Reddish egret, Egretta rufescens (R) (considered "hypothetical")
Cattle egret, Bubulcus ibis
Green heron, Butorides virescens (R)
Black-crowned night-heron, Nycticorax nycticorax

Ibises and spoonbills
Order: PelecaniformesFamily: Threskiornithidae

The family Threskiornithidae includes the ibises and spoonbills. They have long, broad wings. Their bodies tend to be elongated, the neck more so, with rather long legs. The bill is also long, decurved in the case of the ibises, straight and distinctively flattened in the spoonbills. Three species have been recorded in Idaho.

White ibis, Eudocimus albus (R)
Glossy ibis, Plegadis falcinellus (R)
White-faced ibis, Plegadis chihi

New World vultures
Order: CathartiformesFamily: Cathartidae

The New World vultures are not closely related to Old World vultures, but superficially resemble them because of convergent evolution. Like the Old World vultures, they are scavengers, however, unlike Old World vultures, which find carcasses by sight, New World vultures have a good sense of smell with which they locate carcasses. One species has been recorded in Idaho.

Turkey vulture, Cathartes aura

Osprey
Order: AccipitriformesFamily: Pandionidae

Pandionidae is a family of fish-eating birds of prey possessing a very large, powerful hooked beak for tearing flesh from their prey, strong legs, powerful talons, and keen eyesight. The family is monotypic.

Osprey, Pandion haliaetus

Hawks, eagles, and kites
Order: AccipitriformesFamily: Accipitridae

Accipitridae is a family of birds of prey, which includes hawks, eagles, kites, harriers, and Old World vultures. These birds have very large powerful hooked beaks for tearing flesh from their prey, strong legs, powerful talons, and keen eyesight. Thirteen species have been recorded in Idaho.

White-tailed kite, Elanus leucurus (R)
Golden eagle, Aquila chrysaetos
Northern harrier, Circus hudsonius
Sharp-shinned hawk, Accipiter striatus
Cooper's hawk, Accipiter cooperii
Northern goshawk, Accipiter gentilis
Bald eagle, Haliaeetus leucocephalus
Red-shouldered hawk, Buteo lineatus (R)
Broad-winged hawk, Buteo platypterus (R)
Swainson's hawk, Buteo swainsoni
Red-tailed hawk, Buteo jamaicensis
Rough-legged hawk, Buteo lagopus
Ferruginous hawk, Buteo regalis (R)

Barn-owls
Order: StrigiformesFamily: Tytonidae

Barn owls are medium to large owls with large heads and characteristic heart-shaped faces. They have long strong legs with powerful talons. One species has been recorded in Idaho.

Barn owl, Tyto alba

Owls
Order: StrigiformesFamily: Strigidae

Typical owls are small to large solitary nocturnal birds of prey. They have large forward-facing eyes and ears, a hawk-like beak, and a conspicuous circle of feathers around each eye called a facial disk. Thirteen species have been recorded in Idaho.

Flammulated owl, Psiloscops flammeolus (R)
Western screech-owl, Megascops kennicottii
Great horned owl, Bubo virginianus
Snowy owl, Bubo scandiacus (R)
Northern hawk owl, Surnia ulula (R)
Northern pygmy-owl, Glaucidium gnoma
Burrowing owl, Athene cunicularia (R)
Barred owl, Strix varia
Great gray owl, Strix nebulosa (R)
Long-eared owl, Asio otus
Short-eared owl, Asio flammeus
Boreal owl, Aegolius funereus
Northern saw-whet owl, Aegolius acadicus

Kingfishers
Order: CoraciiformesFamily: Alcedinidae

Kingfishers are medium-sized birds with large heads, long pointed bills, short legs, and stubby tails. One species has been recorded in Idaho.

Belted kingfisher, Megaceryle alcyon

Woodpeckers
Order: PiciformesFamily: Picidae

Woodpeckers are small to medium-sized birds with chisel-like beaks, short legs, stiff tails, and long tongues used for capturing insects. Some species have feet with two toes pointing forward and two backward, while several species have only three toes. Many woodpeckers have the habit of tapping noisily on tree trunks with their beaks. Fifteen species have been recorded in Idaho.

Lewis's woodpecker, Melanerpes lewis
Red-headed woodpecker, Melanerpes erythrocephalus (R)
Acorn woodpecker, Melanerpes formicivorus (R)
Red-bellied woodpecker, Melanerpes carolinus (R)
Williamson's sapsucker, Sphyrapicus thyroideus
Yellow-bellied sapsucker, Sphyrapicus varius (R)
Red-naped sapsucker, Sphyrapicus nuchalis
Red-breasted sapsucker, Sphyrapicus ruber (R)
American three-toed woodpecker, Picoides dorsalis
Black-backed woodpecker, Picoides arcticus
Downy woodpecker, Dryobates pubescens
Hairy woodpecker, Dryobates villosus
White-headed woodpecker, Dryobates albolarvatus (R)
Northern flicker, Colaptes auratus
Pileated woodpecker, Dryocopus pileatus (R)

Falcons and caracaras
Order: FalconiformesFamily: Falconidae

Falconidae is a family of diurnal birds of prey, notably the falcons and caracaras. They differ from hawks, eagles, and kites in that they kill with their beaks instead of their talons. Six species have been recorded in Idaho.

Crested caracara, Caracara plancus (R)
American kestrel, Falco sparverius
Merlin, Falco columbarius
Gyrfalcon, Falco rusticolus (R)
Peregrine falcon, Falco peregrinus
Prairie falcon, Falco mexicanus

Tyrant flycatchers
Order: PasseriformesFamily: Tyrannidae

Tyrant flycatchers are Passerine birds which occur throughout North and South America. They superficially resemble the Old World flycatchers, but are more robust and have stronger bills. They do not have the sophisticated vocal capabilities of the songbirds. Most, but not all, are rather plain. As the name implies, most are insectivorous. Twenty-one species have been recorded in Idaho.

Ash-throated flycatcher, Myiarchus cinerascens
Great crested flycatcher, Myiarchus crinitus (R)
Tropical kingbird, Tyrannus melancholicus (R)
Cassin's kingbird, Tyrannus vociferans (R)
Western kingbird, Tyrannus verticalis
Eastern kingbird, Tyrannus tyrannus
Scissor-tailed flycatcher, Tyrannus forficatus (R)
Fork-tailed flycatcher, Tyrannus savana (R)
Olive-sided flycatcher, Contopus cooperi
Western wood-pewee, Contopus sordidulus
Alder flycatcher, Empidonax alnorum (R)
Willow flycatcher, Empidonax traillii
Least flycatcher, Empidonax minimus
Hammond's flycatcher, Empidonax hammondii
Gray flycatcher, Empidonax wrightii
Dusky flycatcher, Empidonax oberholseri
Cordilleran flycatcher, Empidonax occidentalis
Black phoebe, Sayornis nigricans (R)
Eastern phoebe, Sayornis phoebe (R)
Say's phoebe, Sayornis saya
Vermilion flycatcher, Pyrocephalus obscurus (R)

Vireos, shrike-babblers, and erpornis
Order: PasseriformesFamily: Vireonidae

The vireos are a group of small to medium-sized passerine birds. They are typically greenish in color and resemble wood warblers apart from their heavier bills. Nine species have been recorded in Idaho.

White-eyed vireo, Vireo griseus (R)
Bell's vireo, Vireo bellii (R)
Yellow-throated vireo, Vireo flavifrons (R)
Cassin's vireo, Vireo cassinii
Blue-headed vireo, Vireo solitarius (R)
Plumbeous vireo, Vireo plumbeus
Philadelphia vireo, Vireo philadelphicus (R)
Warbling vireo, Vireo gilvus
Red-eyed vireo, Vireo olivaceus

Shrikes
Order: PasseriformesFamily: Laniidae

Shrikes are passerine birds known for their habit of catching other birds and small animals and impaling the uneaten portions of their bodies on thorns. A shrike's beak is hooked, like that of a typical bird of prey. Two species have been recorded in Idaho.

Loggerhead shrike, Lanius ludovicianus (R)
Northern shrike, Lanius borealis

Crows, jays, and magpies
Order: PasseriformesFamily: Corvidae

The family Corvidae includes crows, ravens, jays, choughs, magpies, treepies, nutcrackers, and ground jays. Corvids are above average in size among the Passeriformes, and some of the larger species show high levels of intelligence. Ten species have been recorded in Idaho.

Canada jay, Perisoreus canadensis
Pinyon jay, Gymnorhinus cyanocephalus (R)
Steller's jay, Cyanocitta stelleri
Blue jay, Cyanocitta cristata
California scrub-jay, Aphelocoma californica (R)
Woodhouse's scrub-jay, Aphelocoma woodhouseii (R)
Clark's nutcracker, Nucifraga columbiana
Black-billed magpie, Pica hudsonia
American crow, Corvus brachyrhynchos
Common raven, Corvus corax

Tits, chickadees, and titmice
Order: PasseriformesFamily: Paridae

The Paridae are mainly small stocky woodland species with short stout bills. Some have crests. They are adaptable birds, with a mixed diet including seeds and insects. Five species have been recorded in Idaho.

Black-capped chickadee, Poecile atricapilla
Mountain chickadee, Poecile gambeli
Chestnut-backed chickadee, Poecile rufescens (R)
Boreal chickadee, Poecile hudsonica (R)
Juniper titmouse, Baeolophus ridgwayi (R)

Larks
Order: PasseriformesFamily: Alaudidae

Larks are small terrestrial birds with often extravagant songs and display flights. Most larks are fairly dull in appearance. Their food is insects and seeds. One species has been recorded in Idaho.

Horned lark, Eremophila alpestris

Swallows
Order: PasseriformesFamily: Hirundinidae

The family Hirundinidae is a group of passerines characterized by their adaptation to aerial feeding. These adaptations include a slender streamlined body, long pointed wings, and short bills with a wide gape. The feet are adapted to perching rather than walking, and the front toes are partially joined at the base. Seven species have been recorded in Idaho.

Bank swallow, Riparia riparia
Tree swallow, Tachycineta bicolor
Violet-green swallow, Tachycineta thalassina
Northern rough-winged swallow, Stelgidopteryx serripennis
Purple martin, Progne subis (R)
Barn swallow, Hirundo rustica
Cliff swallow, Petrochelidon pyrrhonota

Long-tailed tits
Order: PasseriformesFamily: Aegithalidae

Long-tailed tits are a group of small passerine birds with medium to long tails. They make woven bag nests in trees. Most eat a mixed diet which includes insects. One species has been recorded in Idaho.

Bushtit, Psaltriparus minimus (R)

Kinglets
Order: PasseriformesFamily: Regulidae

The kinglets are a small family of birds which resemble the titmice. They are very small insectivorous birds in the genus Regulus. The adults have colored crowns, giving rise to their names. Two species have been recorded in Idaho.

Ruby-crowned kinglet, Corthylio calendula
Golden-crowned kinglet, Regulus satrapa

Waxwings
Order: PasseriformesFamily: Bombycillidae

The waxwings are a group of passerine birds with soft silky plumage and unique red tips to some of the wing feathers. In the Bohemian and cedar waxwings, these tips look like sealing wax and give the group its name. These are arboreal birds of northern forests. They live on insects in summer and berries in winter. Two species have been recorded in Idaho.

Bohemian waxwing, Bombycilla garrulus
Cedar waxwing, Bombycilla cedrorum

Silky-flycatchers
Order: PasseriformesFamily: Ptiliogonatidae

The silky flycatchers are a small family of passerine birds which occur mainly in Central America. They are related to waxwings and most species have small crests.

Phainopepla, Phainopepla nitens (R)

Nuthatches
Order: PasseriformesFamily: Sittidae

Nuthatches are small woodland birds. They have the unusual ability to climb down trees head first, unlike other birds which can only go upwards. Nuthatches have big heads, short tails, and powerful bills and feet. Three species have been recorded in Idaho.

Red-breasted nuthatch, Sitta canadensis
White-breasted nuthatch, Sitta carolinensis
Pygmy nuthatch, Sitta pygmaea (R)

Treecreepers
Order: PasseriformesFamily: Certhiidae

Treecreepers are small woodland birds, brown above and white below. They have thin pointed down-curved bills, which they use to extricate insects from bark. They have stiff tail feathers, like woodpeckers, which they use to support themselves on vertical tree limbs and tree trunks. One species has been recorded in Idaho.

Brown creeper, Certhia americana

Gnatcatchers
Order: PasseriformesFamily: Polioptilidae

The family Sylviidae is a group of small insectivorous passerine birds. They mainly occur as breeding species, as the common name implies, in Europe, Asia and, to a lesser extent, Africa. Most are of generally undistinguished appearance, but many have distinctive songs. One species has been recorded in Idaho.

Blue-gray gnatcatcher, Polioptila caerulea (R)

Wrens
Order: PasseriformesFamily: Troglodytidae

Wrens are small and inconspicuous birds, except for their loud songs. They have short wings and thin down-turned bills. Several species often hold their tails upright. All are insectivorous. Seven species have been recorded in Idaho.

Rock wren, Salpinctes obsoletus
Canyon wren, Catherpes mexicanus
House wren, Troglodytes aedon
Pacific wren, Troglodytes pacificus
Winter wren, Troglodytes hiemalis (R)
Marsh wren, Cistothorus palustris
Bewick's wren, Thryomanes bewickii (R)

Mockingbirds and thrashers
Order: PasseriformesFamily: Mimidae

The mimids are a family of passerine birds which includes thrashers, mockingbirds, tremblers, and the New World catbirds. These birds are notable for their vocalization, especially their remarkable ability to mimic a wide variety of birds and other sounds heard outdoors. The species tend towards dull grays and browns in their appearance. Five species have been recorded in Idaho.

Gray catbird, Dumetella carolinensis
Curve-billed thrasher, Toxostoma curvirostre (R)
Brown thrasher, Toxostoma rufum (R)
Sage thrasher, Oreoscoptes montanus
Northern mockingbird, Mimus polyglottos

Starlings
Order: PasseriformesFamily: Sturnidae

Starlings are small to medium-sized passerine birds. They are medium-sized passerines with strong feet. Their flight is strong and direct and they are very gregarious. Their preferred habitat is fairly open country, and they eat insects and fruit. Plumage is typically dark with a metallic sheen. One species has been recorded in Idaho.

European starling, Sturnus vulgaris (I)

Dippers
Order: PasseriformesFamily: Cinclidae

Dippers are small, stout, birds that feed in cold, fast moving streams. One species has been recorded in Idaho.

American dipper, Cinclus mexicanus

Thrushes and allies

Order: PasseriformesFamily: Turdidae

The thrushes are a group of passerine birds that occur mainly but not exclusively in the Old World. They are plump, soft plumaged, small to medium-sized insectivores or sometimes omnivores, often feeding on the ground. Many have attractive songs. Eleven species have been recorded in Idaho.

Eastern bluebird, Sialia sialis (R)
Western bluebird, Sialia mexicana (R)
Mountain bluebird, Sialia currucoides
Townsend's solitaire, Myadestes townsendi
Veery, Catharus fuscescens
Gray-cheeked thrush, Catharus minimus (R)
Swainson's thrush, Catharus ustulatus
Hermit thrush, Catharus guttatus
Wood thrush, Hylocichla mustelina (R)
American robin, Turdus migratorius
Varied thrush, Ixoreus naevius

Old World flycatchers
Order: PasseriformesFamily: Muscicapidae

The Old World flycatchers are a large family of small passerine birds. These are mainly small arboreal insectivores, many of which, as the name implies, take their prey on the wing. One species has been recorded in Idaho.

Red-flanked bluetail, Tarsiger cyanurus (R)

Accentors
Order: PasseriformesFamily: Prunellidae

Accentors are small, fairly drab species superficially similar, but unrelated to, sparrows. However, accentors have thin sharp bills, reflecting their diet of insects in summer, augmented with seeds and berries in winter. One species has been recorded in Idaho.

Siberian accentor, Prunella montanella (R)

Old World sparrows

Order: PasseriformesFamily: Passeridae

Old World sparrows are small passerine birds. In general, sparrows tend to be small plump brownish or grayish birds with short tails and short powerful beaks. Sparrows are seed eaters, but they also consume small insects. One species has been recorded in Idaho.

House sparrow, Passer domesticus (I)

Wagtails and pipits
Order: PasseriformesFamily: Motacillidae

Motacillidae is a family of small passerine birds with medium to long tails. They include the wagtails, longclaws, and pipits. They are slender ground-feeding insectivores of open country. One species has been recorded in Idaho.

American pipit, Anthus rubescens

Finches, euphonias, and allies
Order: PasseriformesFamily: Fringillidae

Finches are seed-eating passerine birds, that are small to moderately large and have a strong beak, usually conical and in some species very large. All have twelve tail feathers and nine primaries. These birds have a bouncing flight with alternating bouts of flapping and gliding on closed wings, and most sing well. Sixteen species have been recorded in Idaho.

Brambling, Fringilla montifringilla (R)
Evening grosbeak, Coccothraustes vespertinus
Pine grosbeak, Pinicola enucleator
Gray-crowned rosy-finch, Leucosticte tephrocotis
Black rosy-finch, Leucosticte atrata (R)
House finch, Haemorhous mexicanus
Purple finch, Haemorhous purpureus (R)
Cassin's finch, Haemorhous cassinii
Common redpoll, Acanthis flammea
Hoary redpoll, Acanthis hornemanni (R)
Red crossbill, Loxia curvirostra
Cassia crossbill, Loxia sinesciuris
White-winged crossbill, Loxia leucoptera
Pine siskin, Spinus pinus
Lesser goldfinch, Spinus psaltria (R)
American goldfinch, Spinus tristis

Longspurs and snow buntings
Order: PasseriformesFamily: Calcariidae

The Calcariidae are a group of passerine birds that were traditionally grouped with the New World sparrows, but differ in a number of respects and are usually found in open grassy areas. Four species have been recorded in Idaho.

Lapland longspur, Calcarius lapponicus
Chestnut-collared longspur, Calcarius ornatus (R)
Thick-billed longspur, Rhyncophanes mccownii (R)
Snow bunting, Plectrophenax nivalis

New World sparrows

Order: PasseriformesFamily: Passerellidae

Until 2017, these species were considered part of the family Emberizidae. Most of the species are known as sparrows, but these birds are not closely related to the Old World sparrows which are in the family Passeridae. Many of these have distinctive head patterns. Twenty-five species have been recorded in Idaho.

Cassin's sparrow, Peucaea cassinii (R)
Grasshopper sparrow, Ammodramus savannarum
Black-throated sparrow, Amphispiza bilineata
Lark sparrow, Chondestes grammacus
Lark bunting, Calamospiza melanocorys
Chipping sparrow, Spizella passerina
Clay-colored sparrow, Spizella pallida (R)
Brewer's sparrow, Spizella breweri
Fox sparrow, Passerella iliaca (R for non-"slate-colored" only)
American tree sparrow, Spizelloides arborea
Dark-eyed junco, Junco hyemalis
White-crowned sparrow, Zonotrichia leucophrys
Golden-crowned sparrow, Zonotrichia atricapilla (R)
Harris's sparrow, Zonotrichia querula
White-throated sparrow, Zonotrichia albicollis
Sagebrush sparrow, Artemisiospiza nevadensis (R)
Vesper sparrow, Pooecetes gramineus
LeConte's sparrow, Ammospiza leconteii (R)
Savannah sparrow, Passerculus sandwichensis
Song sparrow, Melospiza melodia
Lincoln's sparrow, Melospiza lincolnii
Swamp sparrow, Melospiza georgiana (R)
Green-tailed towhee, Pipilo chlorurus (R)
Spotted towhee, Pipilo maculatus
Eastern towhee, Pipilo erythrophthalmus (R)

Yellow-breasted chat
Order: PasseriformesFamily: Icteriidae

This species was historically placed in the wood-warblers (Parulidae) but nonetheless most authorities were unsure if it belonged there. It was placed in its own family in 2017.

Yellow-breasted chat, Icteria virens

Troupials and allies
Order: PasseriformesFamily: Icteridae

The icterids are a group of small to medium-sized, often colorful passerine birds restricted to the New World and include the grackles, New World blackbirds, and New World orioles. Most species have black as a predominant plumage color, often enlivened by yellow, orange, or red. Fourteen species have been recorded in Idaho.

Yellow-headed blackbird, Xanthocephalus xanthocephalus
Bobolink, Dolichonyx oryzivorus
Western meadowlark, Sturnella neglecta
Orchard oriole, Icterus spurius (R)
Hooded oriole, Icterus cucullatus (R)
Bullock's oriole, Icterus bullockii
Baltimore oriole, Icterus galbula (R)
Scott's oriole, Icterus parisorum
Red-winged blackbird, Agelaius phoeniceus
Brown-headed cowbird, Molothrus ater
Rusty blackbird, Euphagus carolinus (R)
Brewer's blackbird, Euphagus cyanocephalus
Common grackle, Quiscalus quiscula (R)
Great-tailed grackle, Quiscalus mexicanus (R)

New World warblers

Order: PasseriformesFamily: Parulidae

The wood-warblers are a group of small often colorful passerine birds restricted to the New World. Most are arboreal, but some like the ovenbird and the two waterthrushes, are more terrestrial. Most members of this family are insectivores. Thirty-eight species have been recorded in Idaho.

Ovenbird, Seiurus aurocapilla
Worm-eating warbler, Helmitheros vermivorum (R)
Louisiana waterthrush, Parkesia motacilla (R)
Northern waterthrush, Parkesia noveboracensis
Golden-winged warbler, Vermivora chrysoptera (R)
Blue-winged warbler, Vermivora cyanoptera (R)
Black-and-white warbler, Mniotilta varia
Prothonotary warbler, Protonotaria citrea (R)
Tennessee warbler, Leiothlypis peregrina (R)
Orange-crowned warbler, Leiothlypis celata
Lucy's warbler, Leiothlypis luciae (R)
Nashville warbler, Leiothlypis ruficapilla
Virginia's warbler, Leiothlypis virginiae
Connecticut warbler, Oporornis agilis (R)
MacGillivray's warbler, Geothlypis tolmiei
Mourning warbler, Geothlypis philadelphia (R)
Common yellowthroat, Geothlypis trichas
Hooded warbler, Setophaga citrina (R)
American redstart, Setophaga ruticilla
Cape May warbler, Setophaga tigrina (R)
Northern parula, Setophaga americana (R)
Magnolia warbler, Setophaga magnolia (R)
Bay-breasted warbler, Setophaga castanea (R)
Blackburnian warbler, Setophaga fusca (R)
Yellow warbler, Setophaga petechia
Chestnut-sided warbler, Setophaga pensylvanica (R)
Blackpoll warbler, Setophaga striata (R)
Black-throated blue warbler, Setophaga caerulescens (R)
Palm warbler, Setophaga palmarum (R)
Pine warbler, Setophaga pinus (R)
Yellow-rumped warbler, Setophaga coronata
Yellow-throated warbler, Setophaga dominica (R)
Black-throated gray warbler, Setophaga nigrescens
Townsend's warbler, Setophaga townsendi
Hermit warbler, Setophaga occidentalis (R)
Black-throated green warbler, Setophaga virens (R)
Canada warbler, Cardellina canadensis (R)
Wilson's warbler, Cardellina pusilla

Cardinals and allies
Order: PasseriformesFamily: Cardinalidae

The cardinals are a family of robust, seed-eating birds with strong bills. They are typically associated with open woodland. The sexes usually have distinct plumages. Ten species have been recorded in Idaho.

Summer tanager, Piranga rubra (R)
Scarlet tanager, Piranga olivacea (R)
Western tanager, Piranga ludoviciana
Rose-breasted grosbeak, Pheucticus ludovicianus (R)
Black-headed grosbeak, Pheucticus melanocephalus
Blue grosbeak, Passerina caerulea (R)
Lazuli bunting, Passerina amoena
Indigo bunting, Passerina cyanea (R)
Painted bunting, Passerina ciris (R)
Dickcissel, Spiza americana (R)

Notes

References

See also
List of birds
Lists of birds by region
List of North American birds

External links
Idaho Bird Records Committee

Idaho